The Mikulin AM-3 (also called RD-3M) was a turbojet engine developed in the Soviet Union by Alexander Mikulin.

Design and development
The development of the high-performance single-shaft engine began in 1948. The engine was used in different versions for the Tupolev Tu-16 and Tu-104, as well as the Myasishchev M-4. It had a single-stage low-pressure and an eight-stage high-pressure compressor, powered by a two-stage high-pressure turbine.

Variants
AM-3 first series version
AM-3A
AM-3D Version for M-4 with  thrust
AM-3M-200 AM-3M-500, AM-3M-500A: developed further versions with 
WP-8 Chinese copy of the AM-3 with  thrust for the Xian H-6 (reproduction of the Tu-16)

Specifications

See also

References

Notes

Bibliography

 Gunston, Bill. World Encyclopaedia of Aero Engines. Cambridge, England. Patrick Stephens Limited, 1989. 

1950s turbojet engines
Mikulin aircraft engines